Korkinsky (masculine), Korkinskaya (feminine), or Korkinskoye (neuter) may refer to:
Korkinsky District, a district of Chelyabinsk Oblast, Russia
Korkinskoye Urban Settlement, a municipal formation which the Town of Korkino in Korkinsky District of Chelyabinsk Oblast, Russia is incorporated as
Korkinskoye (rural locality), several rural localities in Russia